The domain name pro is a generic top-level domain in the Domain Name System of the Internet. Its name is derived from professional, indicating its intended use by certified professionals.

History
In October 2000 Jason Drummond came up with the concept for a new top level domain name (TLD) and established RegistryPro to jointly bid with Register.com for .pro. In May 2002 RegistryPro signed its contract with the Internet Corporation for Assigned Names and Numbers (ICANN), the organization that administers global domain names, under which it will operate the registry for the new top level domain (TLD) .pro.

The domain was originally launched in June 2004 with registrations restricted to four professions: accountants, engineers, lawyers and medical professionals in Canada, Germany, the United Kingdom and the United States.

In March 2005, the registrar EnCirca introduced its controversial ProForwarding service which enabled unverified people and businesses to register  domains. Registrants then had thirty days to provide verified credentials prior to their domain being activated. Total registrations reached 6,899 by January 2008.

Following consultation with ICANN, the domain was relaunched in September 2008 with a wider remit to include government certified professionals in all countries. Registrants are required to self-certify their professional status and agree to terms of use before registration, then subsequently provide detailed license information.

In 2012, RegistryPro was acquired by Afilias Limited.

Registrations
The official domain website describes the eligibility criteria as follows:
Applicant provides professional services
Applicant is admitted to or licensed by a government certification body or jurisdictional licensing entity recognized by a governmental body that regularly verifies the accuracy of its data.
Applicant is in good standing.
The domain registry allows registration of  third-level domains in the following domains:
Legal: law.pro, avocat.pro, bar.pro,  jur.pro, recht.pro
Accountancy: cpa.pro, aaa.pro, aca.pro, acct.pro
Medical: med.pro
Engineering: eng.pro

As of April 2011, the domains may be registered through 44 accredited domain registrars. In January 2011, the number of registered domains surpassed 100,000.
As reported in April 2010, the majority of domains are registered in the United States (42%), followed by France (24%) and Russian Federation (5%).

A regulatory change made the .pro domain name unrestricted to all registrants starting 16 November 2015.

See also
Top-level domain
Domain name

References

External links
 RegistryPro
 Authorized .PRO registrar partners
 IANA delegation record

Generic top-level domains
Computer-related introductions in 2004
sv:Toppdomän#Generiska toppdomäner